The 2023 Southland Conference women's basketball tournament is the postseason women's basketball championship for the Southland Conference. The tournament will take place March 6–9, 2023. The tournament winner received an automatic invitation to the 2023 NCAA Division I women's basketball tournament.

Seeds 
Teams were seeded by record within the conference, with a tie-breaker system to seed teams with identical conference records. The top eight teams in the conference qualified for the tournament. The top two seeds received double byes into the semifinals in the merit-based format. The No. 3 and No. 4 seeds received single byes to the quarterfinals. Tiebreakers used are 1) Head-to-head results, 2) comparison of records against individual teams in the conference starting with the top-ranked team(s) and working down and 3) NCAA NET rankings available on the day following the conclusion of regular-season play.

Schedule

Bracket

* denotes number of overtime periods

See also
2023 Southland Conference men's basketball tournament
Southland Conference women's basketball tournament

References 

2022–23 Southland Conference women's basketball season
Southland Conference
Southland Conference women's basketball tournament
Southland Conference women's basketball tournament
Sports in Lake Charles, Louisiana
Basketball competitions in Louisiana
College basketball tournaments in Louisiana